Siege of Ochakov may refer to:

 Siege of Ochakov (1737), the first siege during the Russo-Turkish War of 1735–1739
 Siege of Ochakov (1788), the second siege during the Russo-Turkish War of 1787–1792
 Naval actions at the siege of Ochakov (1788)